Morgan Lewis Windmill, St. Andrew, Barbados is the biggest and only fully functional sugar windmill in the Caribbean. The mill stopped operating in 1947. In 1962 the mill was given to the Barbados National Trust by its owner Egbert L. Bannister for preservation as a museum. 

The site was listed in the 1996 World Monuments Watch by the World Monuments Fund. Restoration began by the Barbados National Trust during the following summer. In 1997, financial support was provided by American Express for emergency repairs. The mill was dismantled for restoration, and reopened in 1999. With all its original working parts having been preserved intact, the sails were able to turn again after the project was completed, and cane was ground again after more than half a century.

It is one of only two working sugar windmills in the world today. During the 'crop' season, February through July, its sails are put in place and it operates one Sunday in each month, grinding cane and providing cane juice. Around the interior of the mill wall is a museum of sugar mill and plantation artifacts, and an exhibition of old photographs.  Visitors can climb to the top of the mill.

In 2013 was first issued a new 2 Dollars banknote by the Central Bank of Barbados featuring the windmill on the reverse.

Notes

External links
World Monuments Fund - Morgan Lewis Sugar Mill
Morgan Lewis Mill - The Barbados National Trust website

Windmills in Barbados
Saint Andrew, Barbados
World Heritage Sites in Barbados
Tower mills
Grinding mills in Barbados